Eric William Dempster  (25 January 1925 – 15 August 2011) was a New Zealand cricketer who played in five Test matches in 1953 and 1954.

Cricket career
A left-arm spinner and useful lower-order batsman, Dempster played for Wellington from 1947–48 to 1960–61. His best first-class bowling figures of 5 for 46 came in the match against Orange Free State at Bloemfontein in 1953–54, and he scored his only century, 105, for Wellington against Canterbury at Wellington in 1956–57.

He made his Test debut in the Second Test against South Africa in Auckland in 1952–53, and toured South Africa the following season, playing in four of the five Tests. His best performance in Tests was in the Fourth Test in 1953–54 in Johannesburg: he made 21 not out batting at number eight in the first innings then, when New Zealand followed on, he opened and top-scored with 47 in the second innings.

After cricket
Dempster became an umpire and officiated in several of Otago's home first-class and one-day matches from 1971–72 to 1979–80. He also umpired three One Day International matches in Dunedin and Christchurch between 1973–74 and 1975–76.

Dempster worked in Dunedin as the manager of the artificial limb service which was attached to Dunedin Hospital. In the 1986 Queen's Birthday Honours, he was appointed a Member of the Order of the British Empire, for services to the disabled and cricket. He died in Dunedin on 15 August 2011, and was buried at Green Park Cemetery.

See also
 List of One Day International cricket umpires

References

External links
 

1925 births
2011 deaths
New Zealand Test cricketers
New Zealand cricketers
Wellington cricketers
New Zealand Members of the Order of the British Empire
New Zealand One Day International cricket umpires
Burials at Green Park Cemetery